Saint-Stanislas is a municipality in Les Chenaux Regional County Municipality in the Mauricie region of the province of Quebec in Canada. It is located along the Batiscan River. The parish is named in honour of St. Stanislaus Kostka to recall the presence of the Jesuits, who were the owners of the lordship of Batiscan.

Demographics

Population trend:

Others statistics based on 2011 Canadian Census:

Private dwellings occupied by usual residents: 504 (total dwellings: 509)

Mother language of Saint-Stanislas's citizens:
 French as first language: 98.6%
 English as first language: 0.5%
 English and French as first language: 1.0%
 Other as first language: 0%

In 2011 Census, 175 particulars declared themselves as bilingual (English & French), 845 speaking French only and 5 speaking English only. The median age of the population was 52.4 years in 2011. In addition, 89.2% of the population was aged 15 and over.

Motto
The municipality of Saint-Stanislas adopted the motto: "In duty with honour."

Publishing about the history of Saint-Stanislas

Births and Baptisms

1. Lacoursière, Paul. "Répertoire des naissances : paroisse Saint-Stanislas, comté de Champlain, 1787-1986" (Directory of births: parish of Saint-Stanislas, Champlain County, 1787-1986). S. l. P. Lacoursière, [1986], 340 p., collection "Saint-Stanislas", no. 17. 

Weddings

2. Lacoursière, Paul. "Répertoire des mariages: paroisse Saint-Stanislas (comté de Champlain) 1787-1987" (Weddings Directory: Saint-Stanislas parish (county of Champlain) 1787-1987). Saint-Stanislas, The Historical Society of Saint-Stanislas, 146 p. (Coll. "Saint-Stanislas' - no. 11). 

3. Campagna, Dominica. "Répertoire des mariages, Saint-Stanislas de Champlain, ou Saint-Stanislas-de-la-Rivière-des-Envies, 1787-1966" (Directory weddings, Saint-Stanislas de Champlain and Saint-Stanislas-de-la-Rivière des Envies, 1787-1966). Cap-de-la-Madeleine, s.n., 1967, 194 p. 

Deaths and burials

4. Lacoursière, Paul. "Répertoire des décès: paroisse Saint-Stanislas, comté de Champlain, 1787-1986" (Directory death: Saint-Stanislas Parish, Champlain County, 1787-1986). S.L., s.n., s.d. 133 p. (Coll. "Saint-Stanislas" - no. 18). 

5. Lacoursière, Paul. "Répertoire des sépultures: St-Stanislas" (Directory Graves: Saint-Stanislas). Saint-Stanislas Historical Committee, (Coll. "Saint-Stanislas" - our 5-6):
Volume 1: 1787-1870 
Volume 2: 1870-1975 

6. "Complément des répertoires de naissances, mariages, décès, Saint-Stanislas, comté de Champlain: 1986-1996-97" (Additional directories of births, marriages, deaths, Saint-Stanislas, Champlain County: 1986-1996-97), containing 210 years of parish statistics and historical notes, Janine Trépanier-Massicotte, Historical Committee of Saint-Stanislas, 1997, 78 pages, Saint-Stanislas collection - Vol. 22.

Historical books
 "Saint-Stanislas - Comté de Champlain" (Champlain County), Historical Register - Vol. 1 (1760-1937 chronology and Authorities 1757-1977), Janine Trépanier-Massicotte, 67 pages, 1977, Éditions du Bien Public, Collection Saint-Stanislas. Note: This volume includes an appendix "Chronologie - Faits nouveaux et corrections" (Timeline - Developments and corrections), featuring 8 pages. 
 "La destinée des Koska" (The fate of the Koska),  Historical Register - Vol. 2 - Biographies authorities, Paul Lacoursière, 96 pages, 1978, Éditions du Bien Public, Collection Saint-Stanislas, no. 2. 
 "Chez nous en Nouvelle-France - 1608-1787" (At Home in New France - 1608-1787)", Vol. 3 - Foundation of Saint-Stanislas, Janine Trépanier-Massicotte, 1977, 153 pages, Editions du Bien Public, Collection "Saint-Stanislas", no. 3. 
 "Les sports à Saint-Stanislas, Cent ans de sport rural" (Sports in Saint-Stanislas, One Hundred Years of rural sports), Janine Trépanier-Massicotte, 1981, 90 photos, Éditions du Bien Public, Collection "Saint-Stanislas", no. 4. 
 "Anciennes fromageries et beurreries de Saint-Stanislas" (Old cheese and butter of Saint-Stanislas), Gilles Thiffault, 1981, 83 pages, Editions du Bien Public, Saint-Stanislas Collection no. 7, Historical Committee of Saint-Stanislas. 
 "Trucs ingénieux de nos aïeules" (Ingenious tips our grandmothers), Vol. 8 - AFÉAS of Saint-Stanislas, 1981, 50 pages, Editions du Bien Public. Contributing writers: Ghislaine Asselin, Gisèle Beauvillier, Lise Bordeleau, Monique Bouchard, Ghislaine Brouillette, Rose-Alice Brouillette, Ghislaine Denoncourt, Jacqueline Fugère, Marie Mance Guillemette, Hélène Veillette. Drawings: Louise Denoncourt. 
 "Saint-Stanislas, au temps des pionniers - 1787-1808" (Saint-Stanislas, at the time of Pioneers - 1787-1808), After the founding, Vol. 9, Janine Trépanier-Massicotte, 1981, 84 pages, Editions du Bien Public, Collection "Saint-Stanislas", no. 9. 
 "Saint-Stanislas à l'époque de l'érection canonique, 1808-1833" (Saint-Stanislas at the time of the canonical, 1808-1833), Janine Trépanier-Massicotte, Éditions du Bien Public, 1983, 100 pages, Collection Saint-Stanislas. 
 "Visages inconnus de Saint-Stanislas: nos prêtres et religieux, enfants de la paroisse" (Faces of Saint-Stanislas unknown: our priests and religious, children of the parish), Paul Lacoursière, Historical Committee of Saint-Stanislas, Éditions Souvenance, 1984, 47 pages, Saint-Stanislas collection, vol. 13. 
 "Répertoire des naissances - Paroisse Saint-Stanislas (comté de Champlain) – 1787-1986", written by Paul Lacoursière, 1987, 341 pages.
 "Répertoire des mariages Saint-Stanislas de Champlain – 1787-1966", written by F. Dominique Campagna, 194 pages.
 "Répertoire des décès - Paroisse Saint-Stanislas (comté de Champlain)", written by Paul Lacoursière.

See also 
 Lordship of Sainte-Anne-de-la-Pérade (Seigneurie de Sainte-Anne-de-la-Pérade)
 Lordship of Batiscan (Seigneurie de Batiscan)
 Rivière des Envies
 Batiscan River
 Batiscanie, Quebec

References

External links
 
 

Incorporated places in Mauricie
Municipalities in Quebec
Les Chenaux Regional County Municipality